Roman Marych (born 17 July 1977) is a former Ukrainian football striker, and currently assistant coach of FC Lviv in the Ukrainian First League.

Coaching career
After he retired from playing football, he was invited to work as an assistant coach in 2006.

On 25 September 2011, Marych became the new interim coach of FC Lviv in the Ukrainian First League.

References

External links

1977 births
Living people
Ukrainian footballers
Ukrainian football managers
FC Karpaty Lviv players
FC Hoverla Uzhhorod players
FC Skala Stryi (1911) players
FC Haray Zhovkva players
Ukrainian Premier League players
FC Lviv managers
Sportspeople from Lviv
Association football forwards